Flames and Fortune is a 1911 American silent short drama film produced by the Thanhouser Company. The film starred William Garwood and Marie Eline.

External links
 

1911 drama films
1911 films
Silent American drama films
Thanhouser Company films
American silent short films
American black-and-white films
1911 short films
1910s American films